Daniel Pierre (17 January 1891 – 21 January 1979) was a French athlete. He competed in the discus throw and shot put at the 1920 and 1924 Summer Olympics and finished in 15–19th place.

References

1891 births
1979 deaths
French male discus throwers
French male shot putters
Olympic athletes of France
Athletes (track and field) at the 1920 Summer Olympics
Athletes (track and field) at the 1924 Summer Olympics